The 1911 Ontario general election was the 13th general election held in the Province of Ontario, Canada.  It was held on December 11, 1911, to elect the 106 Members of the 13th Legislative Assembly of Ontario (titled as Members of the Provincial Parliament or M.P.P.).

The Ontario Conservative Party, led by Sir James P. Whitney, was elected for a third consecutive term in government, with a slight reduced majority in the Legislature.

The Ontario Liberal Party, led by Newton Rowell, added three members to its caucus.

The legislature's sole Labour MLA, Allan Studholme of Hamilton East, retained his seat.

The four Toronto districts each elected two members in this election. Each seat was contested separately, with each voter in the district allowed to vote for a candidate in each contest.

Results

|-
! colspan=2 rowspan=2 | Political party
! rowspan=2 | Party leader
! colspan=5 | MPPs
! colspan=3 | Votes
|-
! Candidates
!1908
!Dissol.
!1911
!±
!#
!%
! ± (pp)

|style="text-align:left;"|James P. Whitney
|106
|86
|
|82
|4
|205,338
|55.59%
|0.49

|style="text-align:left;"|Newton Rowell
|78
|19
|
|22
|3
|142,245
|38.51%
|0.94

|style="text-align:left;"|
|7
|1
|
|1
|
|8,965
|2.43%
|0.69

|style="text-align:left;"|
|1
|–
|
|1
|1
|1,130
|0.31%
|

|style="text-align:left;"|
|2
|–
|–
|–
|
|3,593
|0.97%
|0.39

|style="text-align:left;"|
|5
|–
|–
|–
|
|3,327
|0.90%
|0.22

|style="text-align:left;"|
|7
|–
|–
|–
|
|3,206
|0.87%
|0.23

|style="text-align:left;"|
|1
|–
|–
|–
|
|1,604
|0.43%
|

|style="text-align:left;"|
|
|–
|–
|–
|
|colspan="3"|Did not campaign

|style="text-align:left;"|
|
|–
|–
|–
|
|colspan="3"|Did not campaign

|style="text-align:left;"|
|
|–
|–
|–
|
|colspan="3"|Did not campaign

|colspan="3"|
|
|colspan="5"|
|-style="background:#E9E9E9;"
|colspan="3" style="text-align:left;"|Total
|207
|106
|106
|106
|
|369,408
|100.00%
|
|-
|colspan="8" style="text-align:left;"|Blank and invalid ballots
|align="right"|4,390
|style="background:#E9E9E9;" colspan="2"|
|-style="background:#E9E9E9;"
|colspan="8" style="text-align:left;"|Registered voters / turnout
|581,657
|64.26%
|8.42
|}

Results by riding
Italicized names indicate members returned by acclamation.

Seats that changed hands

Twenty seats changed allegiance from the previous election:

Liberal to Conservative
Middlesex North
Ottawa East
Perth South
Renfrew North
Simcoe East
Stormont
Wellington West
Wentworth South

 Conservative to Liberal
Bruce Centre
Glengarry
Kent East
Middlesex East
Monck
Norfolk North
Ontario South
Prescott
Sturgeon Falls
Wellington East
Wentworth North

 Conservative to Liberal-Conservative
Rainy River

See also
Politics of Ontario
List of Ontario political parties
Premier of Ontario
Leader of the Opposition (Ontario)

References

Further reading
 

1911 elections in Canada
1911
1911 in Ontario
December 1911 events